Amplypterus mindanaoensis is a species of moth of the  family Sphingidae. It is known from the Philippines.

References

Amplypterus
Moths described in 1996
Moths of Asia